Javier Eduardo Ibarra de la Rosa (born 6 February 1998) is a Mexican professional footballer who plays as a midfielder for Liga de Expansión MX club Atlético Morelia.

Career statistics

Club

Honours
Atlético Morelia
Liga de Expansión MX: Clausura 2022

References

External links
 
  
 
 

Living people
1998 births
Mexico youth international footballers
Association football midfielders
Ascenso MX players
Atlante F.C. footballers
Atlético Morelia players
C.F. Monterrey players
Club León footballers
Liga de Expansión MX players
Liga MX players
Querétaro F.C. footballers
Footballers from Coahuila
Mexican footballers
People from Monclova